Wolfgang Fritsch (born 4 August 1949) is a German lightweight rower. He won a gold medal at the 1975 World Rowing Championships in Nottingham with the lightweight men's eight.

References

1949 births
Living people
German male rowers
World Rowing Championships medalists for West Germany